Robert Verdun may refer to:
 J Robert Verdun, Canadian activist shareholder-rights advocate
 Robert Verdun (figure skater), Belgian figure skater